The Transcaspian marinka (Schizothorax pelzami) is a species of ray-finned fish in the genus Schizothorax from Afghanistan, Turkmenistan and Iran.

References 

Schizothorax
Fish described in 1870
Taxa named by Karl Kessler